Diploderma polygonatum, also known as Ryukyu japalure and Okinawa tree lizard, is a species of lizard found in the Ryukyu Islands and Taiwan. It is diurnal and arboreal. An adult male Diploderma polygonatum measures "61 mm. from snout to vent, and 152 mm. from vent to tip of tail; total length 213 mm." The splenial of this lizard is short, as is that of Trapelus agilis. The lizard is also closely related to Diploderma swinhonis.

References

Diploderma
Reptiles of Japan
Reptiles of Taiwan
Reptiles described in 1861
Taxa named by Edward Hallowell (herpetologist)